The 1943 Dartmouth Indians football team represented Dartmouth College during the 1943 college football season.

Schedule

References

Dartmouth
Dartmouth Big Green football seasons
Dartmouth Indians football